Pharnavaz I was a king of Kartli, an ancient Georgian kingdom known as Iberia in classical antiquity. The Georgian Chronicles credits him with being the first monarch founding the kingship of Kartli and the Pharnavazid dynasty, while other independent chronicles, such as The Conversion of Kartli make him the second Georgian monarch. Based on the medieval evidence, most scholars locate Pharnavaz's rule in the 3rd century BC: 302–237 BC according to Prince Vakhushti of Kartli, 299–234 BC according to Cyril Toumanoff and 284–219 BC according to Pavle Ingoroqva. Pharnavaz's rise, advent and imperial expansion of the Iberian monarchy was directly tied to the victory of Alexander the Great over the Achaemenid Empire. Pharnavaz ruled under the suzerainty of the Seleucid Empire.

Life
According to the Georgian royal annals, Pharnavaz descended from Uplos, son of Mtskhetos, son of Kartlos, who was one of the powerful and famous eight brothers, who from their part were descendants of Targamos, son of Tarsi, the grandson of Japheth, son of the Biblical Noah. He is not directly attested in non-Georgian sources and there is no definite contemporary indication that he was indeed the first of the Georgian kings. His story is saturated with legendary imagery and symbols, and it seems feasible that, as the memory of the historical facts faded, the real Pharnavaz "accumulated a legendary façade" and emerged as the model pre-Christian monarch in the Georgian annals.

According to the  chronicle The Life of Kings, Pharnavaz had a distinguished genealogy, tracing back to Kartlos, the mythical ethnarch of Kartli. His paternal uncle, Samara, held the position of mamasakhlisi ("father of the house") of the Georgian tribes around Mtskheta. Pharnavaz's mother is claimed to have been a Persian woman from Gabai, whom Prince Teimuraz of Georgia and Patriarch Anton I of Georgia identify with a daughter of King Darius III. The entire story of Pharnavaz, although written by a Christian chronicler, abounds in ancient Iranian-like imagery and mystic allusions, a reflection of the archaeologically confirmed cultural and presumably political ties between Iran and Kartli of that time. The name "Pharnavaz" is also an illustrative example with its root par- being based upon the Persian farnah, the divine radiance believed by the ancient Iranians to mark a legitimate dynast (cf. khvarenah). The dynastic tag Parnavaziani ("of/from/named for Pharnavaz") is also preserved in the early Armenian histories as P'arnawazean (Faustus of Byzantium 5.15; fifth century) and P'arazean (History of Armenia 14; probably the early fifth century), an acknowledgment that a king named Pharnavaz was understood to have been the founder of a Georgian dynasty. Pharnavaz is also mentioned in the Stele of Serapit.

Perhaps the most artistically rounded section of the Georgian annals, the narrative follows Pharnavaz's life from birth to burial. Aged 3, small Pharnavaz's family is destroyed, and his heritage is usurped by Azon installed by Alexander the Great during his campaign in Kartli. Alexander's invasion of Iberia, remembered not only by the Georgian historical tradition, but also by Pliny the Elder (4.10.39) and Gaius Julius Solinus (9.19), appears to be memory of some Macedonian interference in Iberia, which must have taken place in connection with the expedition mentioned by Strabo (11.14.9) sent by Alexander in 323 BC to the confines of Iberia, in search of gold mines.

Pharnavaz is brought up fatherless, but a magic dream, in which he anoints himself with the essence of the Sun, heralds the peripeteia. He is persuaded by this vision to "devote [himself] to noble deeds". He then sets off and goes hunting. In a pursuit of a deer, he encounters a mass of treasure stored in a hidden cave. Pharnavaz retrieves the treasure and exploits it to mount a loyal army against the tyrannical Azon. He is aided by Kuji of Colchis, who eventually marries Pharnavaz's sister. The rebels are also joined by 1,000 soldiers from Azon's camp; they are anachronistically referred to by the author as Romans, and claimed to have been entitled by the victorious Pharnavaz as aznauri (i.e., nobles) after Azon (this etymology is false, however).

The main threads of Pharnavaz's story - a fatherless boy hidden and raised in a remote mountains, a forgotten lineage, his dreams, sacral kingship, solar imagery, the hunt, discovery of cave-concealed treasure etc. are reminiscent of legends about Iran's founding kings, like Cyrus the Great and Ardashir I. Pharnavaz's self-anointment may have been a later Sasanian inspiration, as some early Shahanshahs crowned themselves.

Reign

In the ensuing battle, Azon is defeated and killed, and Pharnavaz becomes the king of Kartli at the age of 27. He is reported to have acknowledged the suzerainty of the Seleucids, the Hellenistic successors of Alexander in the Middle East, who are afforded by the Georgian chronicles the generic name of Antiochus.

Pharnavaz is also said to have patterned his administration upon an "Iranian" model.

Pharnavaz had introduced a military-administrative organization based on a network of regional governors or eristavi. The insignia of the eristavi, received from the king, constituted a sceptre, a special signet ring, belt and armament. Iberia had in total seven eristavis, in Colchis, Kakheti, Khunani (modern-day northern Azerbaijan), Samshvilde (Kvemo Kartli), Tsunda (included Javakheti, Kola and Artaani), Odzrkhe and Klarjeti. The kingdom had one spaspet who was under the direct control of the royal power based in Inner Kartli. Eristavates mimicked aspects of Achaemenid satrapies and Seleucid strategoi. The major motive of later historian of the chronicles was to convince posterity that the basic political structure of Kartli was created by the very first Georgian monarch in the wake of Wars of Alexander the Great; was of Achaemenid administrative system and had remained stable throughout Hellenistic, Parthian and Sasanian times. In this way, the long-term viability and stability of the Georgian realm are established.

The hierarchic structure created by Pharnavaz was the following: king; commander-in-chief (spaspet) of the royal army; eristavis; middle commanders (atasistavis tsikhistavis) of the garrisons stationed in the royal strongholds; junior commanders (asistavis) who were the younger sons of the aristocratic families; mercenary professional warriors from the neighboring countries and all the soldiers organized around the entire kingdom.

It is evident that the division of Iberia by Pharnavaz into saeristavos served first and foremost a military aim, namely the organization of people for the purpose of defence. This organization was not so much directed against other countries. Back then the total population of the kingdom would have been, including foreign captives and the population of the tributary areas, about 600,000, which could raise a fairly big army not less than  100,000. According to Strabo the Iberian army numbered 70–80,000 so it appears that each saeristavo had 10,000 soldiers.

While Georgian and Classical evidence makes the contemporaneous Kartlian links with the Seleucids plausible (Toumanoff has even implied that the kings of Kartli might have aided the Seleucids in holding the resurgent Orontids of Armenia in check), Pharnavaz's alleged reform of the eristavi fiefdoms is most likely a back-projection of the medieval pattern of subdivision to the remote past.

Pharnavaz is then reported to have embarked on social and cultural projects; he supervised two building projects: the raising of the idol Armazi – reputedly named after him – on a mountain ledge and the construction of a similarly named fortress.

Pharnavaz made alliances with various North Caucasian peoples during his reign, to whom he called upon for help against both Macedonia and internal foes. He took a Durdzuk woman in marriage, in order to consolidate the alliance of Iberia with the Durdzuks, who helped him consolidate his reign against his unruly vassals. Similarly he married his sister to a Sarmatian chief.

According to the Georgian royal annals he also created the Georgian script and made the Georgian language an official language of the kingdom:

The chronicles report Pharnavaz's lengthy reign of 65 years.

Upon his death, he was buried in front of the idol Armazi and worshipped. His son Saurmag succeeded him to the throne.

Pharnavaz's grave is undisclosed so far. One of the last monarchs who visited his grave to adorn it and pay his respects was King Mirian III. Pharnavaz's very burial in front of idol Armazi suggests a Hellenistic deification of the early monarchs of Iberia.

Pharnavaz and Arrian's Pharasmanes
Several modern scholars have been tempted to make identification between the Pharnavaz of the medieval Georgian tradition and the Pharasmanes of the Greco-Roman historian Arrian, a 2nd-century AD author of The Anabasis of Alexander. Arrian recounts that "Pharasmanes (Фαρασμάνης), king of the Chorasmians", visited Alexander the Great with 1500 horseman, and pledged his support should Alexander desire to campaign to the Euxine lands and subdue Colchians, whom Pharasmanes names as his neighbors. Apart from the similarity of the names of Pharasmanes and Pharnavaz (both names are apparently based on the same root, the Iranian farnah), the king of Chorasmia in Central Asia reports Colchis (today's western Georgia, i.e., the western neighbor of ancient Kartli/Iberia) to be a neighboring country. Some Georgian scholars have suggested that the Greek copyists of  Arrian might have confused Chorasmia with Cholarzene (Chorzene), a Classical rendering of the southwest Georgian marchlands (the medieval Tao-Klarjeti), which indeed bordered with Colchis and Pontus.

According to Arrian:

Legacy

The Bagrationi dynasty claimed descent directly from Pharnavaz. During the continuity of monarchy in Georgia, the Georgian kings presented themselves as heirs to the Kingdom of Iberia founded by King Pharnavaz.

In Tbilisi there is a King Pharnavaz Street, Avenue, and also a statue of Pharnavaz. Also, there are streets named after Pharnavaz in Batumi, Kutaisi, Khashuri, Gori, Gurjaani, Sachkhere, Zestaponi and others. Some buildings, including schools and hotels, also bear his name, as well as about five hundred Georgians.

See also
Pharnavazid dynasty
Georgian monarchs family tree of Iberia

Notes

References

Bibliography

Rapp, Stephen H. (2003) Studies In Medieval Georgian Historiography: Early Texts And Eurasian Contexts. Peeters Bvba .
Rapp, Stephen H. (2014) The Sasanian World through Georgian Eyes: Caucasia and the Iranian Commonwealth in Late Antique Georgian Literature Ashgate Publishing
Georgian royal annals, Life of Pharnavaz: The first Georgian king of Kartli, Part IV. TITUS (Online Version).
Rayfield, Donald (2000) The Literature of Georgia: A History. Routledge, .
Rayfield, Donald (2013), Edge of Empires: A History of Georgia, Reaktion Books
Suny, Ronald Grigor (1994) The Making of the Georgian Nation (2nd edition). Indiana University Press, .
Toumanoff, Cyril (1963) Studies in Christian Caucasian History. Georgetown University Press.
Salia, Kalistrat (1980) Histoire de la nation géorgienne
Gamkrelidze, Gela (2012) Researches in Iberia-Colchology, David Braund ed.

Further reading
Yarshater, Ehsan (1983) The Cambridge History of Iran. Cambridge University Press, .
 «Обращение Грузии», перевод с древнегрузинского Е. С. Такаишвили. Редакционная обработка, исследование и комментарии М. И. Чхартишвили. Тбилиси — 1989
 Lordkipanidze, Otar (1983) "La Géorgie à l'époque hellénistique", dans Dialogues d'histoire ancienne, vol. 9, pp. 197–216.
 Brosset, Marie-Félicité (1849) Histoire de la Géorgie, Saint-Pétersbourg
 Toumanoff, Cyrill (1969) Chronology of the early Kings of Iberia Traditio, Vol. 25, pp. 1–33

Pharnavazid kings of Iberia
Georgian people of Iranian descent
4th-century BC births
3rd-century BC deaths
Creators of writing systems
3rd-century BC rulers
Founders of religions
City founders
Deified people
People from Mtskheta
Founding monarchs